Judd Marmor (May 2, 1910 – December 16, 2003) was an American psychoanalyst and psychiatrist known for his role in removing homosexuality from the American Psychiatric Association's Diagnostic and Statistical Manual of Mental Disorders.

Life and career
Marmor was born in London on May 2, 1910. In 1912, he emigrated with his family moved to Chicago, Illinois. Marmor attended Columbia University for his undergraduate and medical degrees, graduating with a Bachelor's of Arts in 1930 and a Doctor of Medicine in 1933. Marmor also studied at the New York Psychoanalytic Institute. Marmor moved to Los Angeles in 1946, after serving in the Navy during World War II.

In the early 1960s, Marmor supported the then-controversial opinion that homosexuality was a type of sexual behavior, not a deviation or disorder. He also opposed the prevailing opinion that homosexuality was caused from a dysfunctional upbringing. Marmor's stance on homosexuality was particularly influential because Marmor was a widely respected and mainstream psychoanalyst; not a peripheral figure like most others speaking to the issue. In the mid-1960s, Marmor and Evelyn Hooker began collaborating on depathologizing homosexuality. Hooker contributed a chapter to Marmor's 1965 book Sexual Inversion: The Multiple Roots of Homosexuality and recruited him for a task force on homosexuality sponsored by the National Institute of Mental Health. Marmor continued to support his position that homosexuality did not meet the criteria applied for a mental illness while serving as the vice president of the American Psychiatric Association. In 1974, the members of the American Psychiatric Association voted to remove homosexuality from the Diagnostic and Statistical Manual of Mental Disorders, a move that was critical in the advancement of gay rights. Later that year, Marmor was elected president of the American Psychiatric Association.

Marmor also influenced the movement in psychiatry away from pure psychoanalysis and towards shorter-term psychotherapy.

Marmor operated a private psychiatry practice in Los Angeles, where he was popular among the Hollywood elite. He continued to practice until his death in 2003.

Marmor served as director of psychiatry at Cedars-Sinai Medical Center from 1965 to 1972. He was the Franz Alexander Professor of Psychiatry at the University of Southern California from 1972 to 1980, and an adjunct professor of psychiatry at the University of California, Los Angeles from 1980 to 1985. In addition to serving as president of the American Psychiatric Association, Marmor was also at times president of the American Academy of Psychoanalysis, the Group for the Advancement of Psychiatry, and the Southern California Psychoanalytic Society and Institute.

Marmor was a prolific author, writing over 350 scientific papers and writing or editing eight books. He was also an essayist who wrote on topics including civil rights and politics, publishing essays opposing McCarthyism, the nuclear bomb, and the Vietnam War.

Marmor was married to Katherine Marmor until her death in 1999. They had one son, Michael. Marmor died on December 16, 2003.

References

External links
Judd Marmor Papers via ONE National Gay and Lesbian Archives

1910 births
2003 deaths
American psychiatrists
Analysands of Hanna Fenichel
Presidents of the American Psychiatric Association
British emigrants to the United States
American psychoanalysts
Columbia University Vagelos College of Physicians and Surgeons alumni
University of California, Los Angeles faculty
University of Southern California faculty
Physicians of the Cedars-Sinai Medical Center
American essayists
Columbia College (New York) alumni